Charoen Wattanasin (born 1937) is a former badminton player from Thailand who won international championships in the late 1950s and early 1960s.

Career 
Between 1958 and 1962 Wattanasin captured the open men's singles titles of Malaya, Ireland, Scotland, Norway, and France. He also shared the open men's doubles titles of Malaya, Scotland, the Netherlands, and the USA. Wattanasin was a men's singles runner-up to Denmark's formidable Erland Kops at the All-England Championships in 1960 and 1962. He represented Thailand in the Thomas Cup (men's international team) campaigns of 1957-1958 and 1963-1964.

Corruption scandal
In 2000 he was inducted into the World Badminton Hall of Fame. However, there were scandals and corruption issues when he was the president of the Badminton Association of Thailand between 2009 and 2013. In 2010, 16 players and coaches quit Badminton Association of Thailand as they did not receive supporting fee from the association, while Charoen claimed that he already provided support.

Political perspective 
In 2014, he criticised the European Union's decision to impose political sanctions against Thailand for overthrowing an elected government by stating that Thai people should ban products from the EU, particularly cars, and stop travelling to the EU as well; however, his sons owned BMWs and his daughter was a communication general manager for Chanel Thailand.

Personal life 
He is a father of two famous singers Jirayut Wattanasin and Jetrin Wattanasin.

Achievements

Asian Games 
Men's Doubles

Southeast Asian Peninsular Games 
Men's singles

Men's doubles

International tournaments 
Men's singles

Men's doubles

Mixed doubles

Invitational tournament 
Men's singles

References 

Charoen Wattanasin
Asian Games medalists in badminton
Badminton players at the 1962 Asian Games
Badminton players at the 1966 Asian Games
1937 births
Living people
Charoen Wattanasin
Charoen Wattanasin
Charoen Wattanasin
Charoen Wattanasin
Charoen Wattanasin
Southeast Asian Games medalists in badminton
Charoen Wattanasin
Charoen Wattanasin
Medalists at the 1962 Asian Games
Medalists at the 1966 Asian Games
Competitors at the 1959 Southeast Asian Peninsular Games